Nakamaru (written: 中丸) is a Japanese surname. Notable people with the surname include:

, Japanese journalist, television personality and writer
, Japanese idol, singer-songwriter, actor, television personality and radio host

Japanese-language surnames